The Shaoshan 6 (Chinese: 韶山六) is a type of electric locomotive used on the People's Republic of China's national railway system. This locomotive was the sixth Chinese electric main line locomotive, built by the Zhuzhou Electric Locomotive Works.

The overall arrangement of SS6 is similar to SS3. The main circuit of SS6 is influenced by the 6K, an electric locomotive model imported from Japan. The power supply was industrial-frequency single-phase AC, and the axle arrangement Co-Co.

Preservation
 SS6-0001: is preserved at Zhengzhou Railway Driver College.
 SS6-0002: is preserved at China Railway Museum.

See also
 China Railways SS3
 China Railways SS6B
 China Railways 8K
 Zhengzhou Railway Bureau
 Longhai Railway

References

Co-Co locomotives
SS6
25 kV AC locomotives
Zhuzhou locomotives
Railway locomotives introduced in 1991
Standard gauge locomotives of China